The Honda XL1000V Varadero is a dual-sport motorcycle produced by Honda. Different models have been in production from 1998 to 2013. Fuel injection was introduced in 2003, which offered a smoother motor and throttle operation, as well as ABS. It has capabilities for long road trips and limited off-road use. A smaller  version, the XL125V Varadero is also produced.

Varadero is the big brother of the Transalp. Since 2015, a newer design, the Africa Twin 1000, has  been produced, and in some markets offering a DCT transmission.

XL1000VA
Honda's earliest XL1000V Varadero flagship Adventure Touring motorcycle with a 996 cc V-twin engine was introduced to the public at the 1998 Munich motorcycle show. First launched in 1998 as a 1999 Model Year, its engine architecture is based on the Honda VTR1000F Firestorm/Superhawk. The Adventure category refers to motorcycles that are designed for long-range touring with basic off-road capability, hence the term Adventure used by Honda as opposed to Dual Sport as used on the Honda XR650L.

All versions feature a liquid-cooled V-twin engine.  In 2001, Honda introduced its Honda Ignition Security System (HISS),  essentially an engine immobilizer system similar to the ones used in automobiles.

In 2001, production of the Varadero was switched to the Spanish Montesa Honda factory outside of Barcelona.

For 2003, the Varadero received some major changes. These included the move to fuel injection and the addition of a six-speed gearbox, some cosmetic alterations and a new instrument panel. These changes benefited the model with better torque and fuel consumption.  In 2004 ABS was introduced, and it is now fitted as standard in a number of markets based on Honda's safety commitment.

References

External links

honda.co.uk

Varadero Honda
Dual-sport motorcycles
Motorcycles introduced in 1999